White Houses is a song performed by Eric Burdon & the Animals in 1968. It was the opening track from their psychedelic rock album Every One Of Us. "White Houses" peaked #67 on the US pop singles chart and #46 on the Canadian RPM charts.  The B-side was "River Deep, Mountain High",  later included on their album Love Is.  "River Deep, Mountain High" was also viewed as the A-side of the release in some countries. 

In 1995, Burdon re-recorded the song. It is featured on Absolutely the Best (1999).

In 2002, it was covered by Ed Kuepper as a part of a medley, which featured the song "Hey Gyp", another song performed by Eric Burdon.

References

1968 singles
Songs written by Eric Burdon
The Animals songs
Song recordings produced by Tom Wilson (record producer)
MGM Records singles
1968 songs